Thomas Fauconberg, 5th Baron Fauconberg (20 July 1345 – 9 September 1407) was an English peer.

Fauconberg was the eldest son of Walter Fauconberg, 4th Baron Fauconberg, and his wife, Maud. Circa 1376, Thomas joined the French in the Hundred Years' War and was imprisoned in Gloucester Castle, for treason, from 1378 to 1391. After being released, he was allegedly considered mentally retarded, despite being appointed to "keep the seas" (with the 4th Baron Clinton and Sir Richard Waldegrave) in 1402. He was later considered sane when examined by King Henry IV and his Council in c. 1406.

On 17 November 1366, Lord Fauconberg had married Constance de Felton (died 1402) and they had one son, John, (died 1405). After his first wife died, he was married to Joan Brounflete (died 1409) and they had one daughter, Joan (1406–1490) who later married William Neville, Earl of Kent.

In 1405, Fauconberg's son had been executed for his part in the conspiracy against Henry IV and so on Fauconberg's own death in 1407, his title became abeyant. It was later called out abeyance for the Earl of Kent in right of his wife.

Sources
Burke's Peerage & Gentry, 107th edition

Fauconberg, Thomas de Fauconberg, 5th Baron
Fauconberg, Thomas de Fauconberg, 5th Baron
5